Mounia Meslem (born in Tébessa on 24 June 1961), is an Algerian government minister. Her position is Minister of National Solidarity, the Family and Women Affairs.

References  

People from Tébessa
Government ministers of Algeria
Living people
1961 births
Women government ministers of Algeria
21st-century Algerian women politicians
21st-century Algerian politicians